Škrlec is a surname. Notable people with the surname include:

 Davor Škrlec (born 1963), Croatian politician
 Ivan Škrlec (1873–1951), Croatian politician

Croatian surnames